Events in the year 1798 in Portugal.

Incumbents
Monarch: Mary I

Events

Arts and entertainment

Sports

Births

12 October – King Dom Pedro IV, King of Portugal, Emperor of Brazil (died 1834).

Deaths
 18 October – Francisco de Lacerda, explorer (born 1750)

References

 
1790s in Portugal
Years of the 18th century in Portugal